The diffuse chemosensory system (DCS) is an anatomical structure composed of solitary chemosensory cells and chemosensory clusters. The concept of DCS has been advanced in 2005, after the discovery that cells similar to gustatory elements are present in several organs of the respiratory and digestive apparatuses.

The elements forming the DCS share common morphological and biochemical characteristics with the taste cells located in taste buds of the oropharyngeal cavity. In particular, they may express molecules of the chemoreceptorial cascade (e.g. trans-membrane taste receptors, the G-protein gustducin, PLCbeta2, IP3R3, TRPM5). 

Morphologically, the elements of the DCS are polymorphic. Some of them have an apical tuft of rigid microvilli (brush cells). Other elements have secretory exocrine granules and others may have endocrine differentiation. Often these elements are innervated.

To date, the functional role for the DCS is unknown also if several hypotheses have been advanced.

Questions remain about the role of the diffuse chemosensory system in control of complex functions (e.g. airway surface liquid secretion) and about the involvement of chemoreceptors in respiratory diseases. The chemoreceptive capacity of the DCS seems to protect against exogenous substances.

References

Sbarbati A, Osculati F.  The taste cell-related diffuse chemosensory system. Prog Neurobiol 2005; 75: 295–307.
Gilbertson TA, Damak S, Margolskee RF. The molecular physiology of taste transduction. Curr Opin Neurobiol 2000; 10: 519–27.
Höfer D, Drenckhahn D. Cytoskeletal markers allowing discrimination between brush and other epithelial cells of the gut including etnteroendocrine cells. Histochem Cell Biol 1996; 105:405 –12.
Höfer D, Drenckhahn D. Identification of the taste cell G-protein alpha-gustducin in brush cells of the rat pancreatic duct system. Histochem Cell Bio1998; 110: 303–309.
Höfer D, Puschel B, Drenckhahn D.  Taste receptor-like cells in the rat gut identified by expression of α-gustducin. Proc Natl Acad Sci USA 1996; 93:  6631– 34.
Merigo F, Benati D, Tizzano M, Osculati F, Sbarbati A. α-gustducin immunoreactivity in the airways. Cell Tissue Res  2005; 319: 211–19.
Merigo F, Benati D, DiChio M, Osculati F, Sbarbati A.  Secretory cells of the airway express molecules of the chemoreceptive cascade. Cell Tissue Res 2007; 327: 231-247.
Sbarbati A, Crescimanno C, Benati D, Osculati F. Solitary chemosensory cells in the developing chemoreceptorial epithelium of the vallate papilla. Journal of Neurocytology 1998; 27:631–35.
Sbarbati A, Crescimanno C, Bernardi P, Osculati F. Alpha-gustducin immunoreactive solitary chemosensory cells in the developing chemoreceptorial epithelium of the rat vallate papilla. Chem senses 1999; 24:469–72.
Sbarbati A., Merigo F, Benati D, Tizzano M, Bernardi P, Crescimanno C, Osculati F. Identification and characterization of a specific sensory epithelium in the rat larynx. J Comp Neurol 2004a; 475:188-201.
Sbarbati A., Merigo F, Benati D, Tizzano M, Bernardi P, Osculati F. Laryngeal chemosensory clusters. Chem Senses 2004b; 29:683-92.

Sensory systems
Sensory receptors